Colour Catcher is a brand name of colour run prevention products manufactured by Spotless Group. Colour Catcher is distributed by Spotless Punch in the United Kingdom, by Punch Industries in Ireland, in Spain as Atrapa Color, by Eau Ecarlate in France as Décolor Stop, and by Guaber in Italy as Acchiappacolore.

History
Colour Catcher was invented by Pat McNamee at Irish company Punch Industries in 1993. The product was created in the company's labs at Little Island, Cork. The product range is an international best-seller, and the market leader in colour protection.

Product description

Colour Catcher products are claimed to prevent colour runs in washing machine cycles and allow coloured and whites to be washed together without incurring colour run accidents. It is sold in packets of 10-20 paper-like sheets that are intended to absorb the excess dyes released during the washing process by garments. There are several other products under the Colour Catcher name, including an oxi-action stain remover and a sheet that is claimed to restore and maintains clothes' whiteness.

To help prevent a Colour Catcher sheet from jamming the inner workings of a washing machine, it can be helpful to put the sheet into a mesh delicate wash bag.

International
The Colour Catcher brand is marketed in the United States by S.C. Johnson under its Shout brand (the US product omits the "u" in colour, in accordance with American English). Colour Catcher is available in most European states. Colour Catcher is also sold in Cyprus, Australia, the United Arab Emirates, and Russia.

Colour Catcher sheets are not sold in Canada; one competing product available in Canada is called "Dr. Beckmann Colour & Dirt Collector".

References

Further reading

External links
 British product website
 Dutch product website
 French distributors' website
 Australian distributors' website

Cleaning products
Laundry detergents